BGD or Bgd may refer to:

 BGD, the Bangladesh ISO 3166-1 alpha-3 country code
 Belgrade, the capital city of Serbia
 BGD, the Hutchinson County Airport IATA airport code